Tihidi is a subdistrict in Bhadrak district of Odisha, India.

References 

Villages in Bhadrak district